Alicia Mead (born 23 October 1995) is an English professional squash player who currently plays for England women's national squash team. She achieved her highest career PSA singles ranking of 94 in February 2020 during the 2019-20 PSA World Tour.

References

External links 

 Profile at PSA
 

1995 births
Living people
English female squash players
Sportspeople from Nuneaton